The participation of Macau in the ABU TV Song Festival has occurred eight times since the inaugural ABU TV Song Festival began in 2012. Since their début in 2014, the Macanese entry has been organised by the national broadcaster Teledifusão de Macau (TDM).

History

2014
Teledifusão de Macau (TDM) made their debut in the ABU TV Song Festivals at 2014 and they hosted the festival in The Venetian Theatre, Macau, China Macau were represented on their debut by the band Blademark with the song "Heartcore".

2015
On 19 August 2015 it was announced that Macau would participate in the ABU TV Song Festival for a second time. On 13 September 2015 it was revealed that Macau would be represented by Ma Man Lei, Kyla with the song "Back to Back".

Participation overview

Hostings

References 

Countries at the ABU Song Festival